Antea may refer to:
Antea (Parmigianino), a painting by the Italian painter Parmigianino 
Antea Cement, an Albanian company
 Antea LifeStyle Center in Querétaro, Mexico, the largest shopping center in Mexico
Stheneboea, a character Greek mythology
Antaea, an epithet for a number of mythological goddesses
Recilia antea, a bug of family Cicadellidae

See also

Antes (name)